Shahrsanati-ye Takestan (also Romanized as Shahrṣanʿatī-ye Tāḵestān) is a village in Narjeh Rural District, in the Central District of Takestan County, Qazvin Province, Iran. At the 2006 census, its population was 30, in 12 families.

References 

Populated places in Takestan County